Syed Rafiqul Haque Sohel is a politician in Sunamganj District of Sylhet Division of Bangladesh. He was elected a member of the parliament from the Sylhet-1 (now Sunamganj-1) as a Bangladesh Nationalist Party candidate in 1979 and was elected a member of the parliament from the Sunamganj-1 as a candidate of Bangladesh Awami League in the June 1996 parliamentary election.

Birth and early life 
Syed Rafiqul Haque Sohel was born in Sunamganj District of Sylhet Division of Bangladesh.

Political life 
He stood as a People's Democratic Party (PDP) candidate in the 1970 Pakistani general election. He was elected to parliament from Sylhet-1 (now Sunamganj-1) as a Bangladesh Nationalist Party candidate in 1979. and elected a member of the parliament from the Sunamganj-1 as a candidate of Bangladesh Awami League in the June 1996 parliamentary election.

References 

People from Sunamganj District
Bangladesh Nationalist Party politicians
Awami League politicians
2nd Jatiya Sangsad members
7th Jatiya Sangsad members
Bangladeshi people of Arab descent